David John Williams (born May 1969 in Wales) is the founder of quantum encryption company Arqit Limited.

He graduated with a BA in Economics and Politics from the University of Leeds.

Williams was co-founder of Avanti Communications Group plc, the United Kingdom's first start-up operator, listed on the London Stock Exchange. Avanti was the first company to operate a High Throughput Satellite in EMEA and notably won the contract to build the backhaul system for the British Government's homeland security "Emergency Services Network". The company delisted from the London Stock Exchange in 2019 with a share price of 0.25p. In November 2014, the shares were trading at 320p a share. 

Williams was Chairman of the Advisory Board of Seraphim Space Ventures, whose creation he initiated in partnership with the UK Space Agency. 

Williams also founded in 1999 a start up venture capital company called Active Media Capital Ltd which wound up in 2006 returning 768% of investors capital.  He was awarded the Entrepreneur of the Year Award at the Quoted Company Awards 2006.

He was awarded a Queen's Award for Export in 2015.

References

1969 births
Living people
Alumni of the University of Leeds
Welsh chief executives